Hebblethwaite may refer to :

James Hebblethwaite (22 September 1857 – 13 September 1921) was an English-born Australian poet, teacher and clergyman.
Peter Hebblethwaite (September 30, 1930, Ashton-under-Lyne, Lancashire - December 18, 1994, Oxford), was a British journalist and biographer.